Wattamondara railway station is a railway station on the Blayney–Demondrille railway line in western, New South Wales(Australia).

References

Regional railway stations in New South Wales
Blayney–Demondrille railway line